Mack J. Wilberg (born February 20, 1955) is an American composer, arranger, conductor, and choral clinician who has been the music director of the Tabernacle Choir at Temple Square (Choir) since 2008.

Early life and education 
Wilberg was born in Price and raised in Castle Dale, Utah. Wilberg learned how to play the piano at the age of four. He served as a missionary for the Church of Jesus Christ of Latter-day Saints (LDS Church) in South Korea where he was part of New Horizons, a vocal group made up of LDS Church missionaries.

Wilberg attended Brigham Young University (BYU) after finishing his missionary service, and earned a Bachelor of Music in piano performance and composition in 1979. He then completed graduate study in choral music at the USC Thornton School of Music, earning both Master of Music and Doctor of Musical Arts degrees, with a doctoral dissertation researching works written for chorus and piano.

Career 
Wilberg began his career at BYU as a professor of music. Wilberg was a professor of music at BYU from 1984 to 1999, where he directed the Men's Chorus and Concert Choir. At BYU, he was a member of the American Piano Quartet, which toured internationally and commissioned many original works, with Wilberg creating many of its arrangements himself.

He was the Choir's associate director and music director of the Chorale at Temple Square from May 1999 until his appointment as the Choir's director on March 28, 2008. Wilberg is a noted composer and arranger, and his works are published by Oxford University Press. His arrangements have been performed at the funerals for United States presidents Gerald Ford, Ronald Reagan, and George H. W. Bush.

Wilberg's numerous choral compositions and arrangements are performed and recorded by choral organizations throughout the world. For many of the works he has written/arranged for the Choir, public performances have involved guests artists invited by the Choir, including Renée Fleming, Frederica von Stade, Bryn Terfel, the King’s Singers, Audra McDonald, David Archuleta, Natalie Cole, Brian Stokes Mitchell, Kristin Chenoweth, Madeleine Albright, Walter Cronkite, and Claire Bloom. In 2006, he was awarded the Brock Commission from the American Choral Directors Association.

Wilberg plans and conducts a weekly performance of Music & the Spoken Word.

Family 
Wilberg's father was part owner of the family's coal mine but was killed in a 1964 mining accident, well before the 1984 fire.

Wilberg and his wife, Rebecca, are the parents of four children.

Rebecca also works with Wilberg as a vocal coach, and a member of the Choir School faculty of the Tabernacle Choir.

References

External links
Biography of Wilberg from  churchofjesuschrist.org
Biography of Wilberg from  ClassicalComposers.org
Biography of Wilberg from The Tabernacle Choir organization

1955 births
Latter Day Saints from California
Living people
American Mormon missionaries in South Korea
Brigham Young University faculty
USC Thornton School of Music alumni
Brigham Young University alumni
Singers from Utah
Tabernacle Choir music directors
20th-century Mormon missionaries
American male composers
21st-century American composers
American music arrangers
American choral conductors
American male conductors (music)
People from Emery County, Utah
Latter Day Saints from Utah
People from Price, Utah
21st-century American conductors (music)